The 6th assembly of the Croatian Parliament was constituted on 11 January 2008. It came into existence following the November 2007 general election and consisted of 153 representatives elected from 10 geographical and two special electoral districts. It was dissolved on 28 October 2011, about a month before the 2011 general election.

Electoral system in Croatia

Since 1999 Croatia has been divided into 10 geographically-based electoral districts. These districts are named using Roman numerals and were formed according to the number of voters so that each district holds around 250,000–300,000 registered voters. These districts therefore do not correspond to the borders of top administrative divisions within Croatia and each district contains one or more or parts of several Croatian counties.

Each district sends 14 MPs to the parliament and winning candidates are determined using the party-list proportional representation voting system. This means that parties make lists of 14 candidates to be elected, and seats get allocated to each party in proportion to the number of votes the party receives, with the election threshold set at 5 percent of votes in each district, calculated using the standard D'Hondt formula.

In addition, there are two non-geographical districts. In District XI, up to 12 members are chosen by proportional representation - depending on the number of voters in Croatia - to represent Croatian citizens residing abroad (this district is commonly referred to as the diaspora electorate). Although all people living outside Croatia are eligible to vote for this list, the majority of voters who turnout for this list traditionally consists of Croats of Bosnia and Herzegovina, the majority of whom hold dual Croatian and Bosnian citizenships. In District XII an additional 8 members are elected to represent the 22 ethnic minorities in Croatia which are legally recognized as such in the Croatian Constitution, with 3 of these seats reserved for the Serbian minority.

Since the seats are allocated according to the proportion of votes received in each district, parties usually nominate senior party officials on top of their lists in districts where they have traditionally enjoyed good levels of support, to ensure that the party's most prominent members win parliamentary seats. All candidates are elected to four-year terms. However, many MPs who are members of post-election ruling coalitions often get appointed to various ministerial and government positions while others serve as city mayors or directors of various government agencies. In such cases they are required by law to put their parliamentary mandate on hiatus for the duration of their other term in office and their seats are then taken by party-appointed deputy MPs.

2007 election results
According to the November 2007 election results, 122 out of 153 (or almost 80 percent) of seats were won by the two major parties, the centre-right HDZ and the centre-left SDP. HDZ then entered a post-election coalition agreement with several minor parties and formed a coalition government. The 153 parliament seats were divided as follows (members of the ruling coalition indicated in bold):

Croatian Democratic Union (HDZ) – 66 seats
Social Democratic Party of Croatia (SDP) – 56 seats
Croatian People's Party – Liberal Democrats (HNS) – 7 seats
Croatian Peasant Party (HSS) – 6 seats
Croatian Democratic Assembly of Slavonia and Baranja (HDSSB) – 3 seats
Independent Democratic Serb Party (SDSS) – 3 seats
Istrian Democratic Assembly (IDS) – 3 seats
Croatian Social Liberal Party (HSLS) – 2 seats
Party of Democratic Action of Croatia (SDAH) – 1 seat
Croatian Party of Pensioners (HSU) – 1 seat
Croatian Party of Rights (HSP) – 1 seat
Independent – 4 seats

(Members of HDZ, HSS, SDSS and HSLS were appointed to ministerial positions in the Cabinet of Ivo Sanader II, while 5 representatives of ethnic minorities (four independents and one from ASH) and the single MP representing HSU signed a voting agreement with the ruling coalition. This gave the ruling coalition an 83-member majority in the 153-seat parliament.)

Parliament officials
The president of the parliament (often also called the speaker in English) is Luka Bebić (HDZ).
Vicepresidents of the parliament are:

 Vladimir Šeks (HDZ)
 Ivan Jarnjak (HDZ)
 Josip Friščić (HSS)
 Željka Antunović (SDP)
 Neven Mimica (SDP)

The secretary is Josip Sesar.

Composition of the 6th Sabor
Members of HDZ, HSS, SDSS and HSLS were appointed to ministerial positions in the Cabinet of Ivo Sanader II, while 5 representatives of ethnic minorities (four independents and one from SDA) and the single MP representing HSU signed a voting agreement with the ruling coalition. This gave the ruling coalition an 83-member majority in the 153-seat parliament.

Luka Bebić (HDZ) was appointed Speaker of Parliament in the 6th assembly, replacing Vladimir Šeks (HDZ) who had held the post since December 2003.

Government coalition parties denoted with bullets (•)

MPs by party 
This is a list of MPs elected to Sabor in the 2007 general election, sorted by party. Note that this table is a record of the 2007 election results, it is not a record of the current status of Sabor. The Changes table below records all changes in party affiliation.

Changes
Note that a number of MPs who are high-ranking members of parties in the ruling coalition were subsequently appointed to various ministerial and governmental positions, while others continued to serve as city mayors. In such cases they are required by Croatian law to put their parliamentary mandate on hiatus for the duration of their other term of office and in the meantime their seats are then taken by a party-appointed replacement MP. Those replacements are not documented here.

References

External links
List of members of the 6th Sabor following the 2007 election results, published by Jutarnji list on 26 November 2007 
Full list of members on 28 October 2011 at the Croatian Parliament website 

Lists of representatives in the modern Croatian Parliament by term
2000s in Croatia